The British Speedway Championship is an annual motorcycle speedway competition open to British national speedway riders.
The winner of the event becomes the British Speedway Champion.

History
Inaugurated in 1961 as a qualifying round of the Speedway World Championship it was open to riders from Britain and the British dominions. It was initially dominated by riders from New Zealand such as Barry Briggs and Ivan Mauger because of the British Final forming part of the World Speedway championship qualifying rounds. Briggs and Mauger were multiple world champions. It was not until 1975 that the final was restricted to British riders. Countries such as Australia and New Zealand then held their own World Individual Speedway championship qualifying rounds. In the first dozen finals, it was only won twice by a British born rider, both times by Peter Craven.

Australians Rory Schlein and Jason Crump rode under an ACU (British) licence.

British Champions

Medals classification

See also
British Speedway Under 18 Championship
British Speedway Under 21 Championship
Speedway in the United Kingdom

References

 
Speedway competitions in the United Kingdom

British
National championships in the United Kingdom